UFC Fight Night: Volkov vs. Aspinall (also known as UFC Fight Night 204 and UFC on ESPN+ 62) was a mixed martial arts event produced by the Ultimate Fighting Championship that took place on March 19, 2022 at The O2 Arena in London, England.

Background
The event was the first in London since UFC Fight Night: Till vs. Masvidal in March 2019. The UFC was expected to return to the city in March 2020 at UFC Fight Night: Woodley vs. Edwards and in September 2021 at UFC Fight Night: Brunson vs. Till, but the first event was cancelled due to the COVID-19 pandemic, and the latter was relocated to Las Vegas.

A heavyweight bout between former Bellator Heavyweight World Champion Alexander Volkov and Tom Aspinall headlined the event. Aspinall was originally expected to face Shamil Abdurakhimov, but after he was pulled in favor of the main event spot, Abdurakhimov was rescheduled against Sergei Pavlovich instead.

A bantamweight bout between Jack Shore and Umar Nurmagomedov was scheduled for the event. However, Nurmagomedov was removed from the bout due to undisclosed reasons and replaced by Timur Valiev.

A flyweight bout between Jake Hadley and Francisco Figueiredo was scheduled for the event. However, Figueiredo withdrew from the event due to undisclosed reasons and was replaced by Allan Nascimento. Hadley eventually had to pull out due to injury and the bout was scrapped. They were later rescheduled to meet at UFC Fight Night 209.

A lightweight bout between Jai Herbert and Mike Davis was scheduled for the event. However, Davis withdrew from the bout due to personal reasons and was replaced by Ilia Topuria.

Cláudio Silva was expected to face Gunnar Nelson in a welterweight bout. However, Silva pulled out in early March due to a knee injury. He was replaced by Takashi Sato.

A bantamweight bout between Liudvik Sholinian and Nathaniel Wood was scheduled for this event. However, due to the Russian invasion of Ukraine, Sholinian was unable to leave Ukraine or train properly, so he was replaced by Vince Morales. In turn, just days before the event, Morales withdrew due to illness. The pairing will be rescheduled for a future event.

Results

Bonus awards
The following fighters received $50,000. While the UFC usually gives out four bonus awards for each event, a record of nine post-fight bonuses were given out to each fighter who secured a finish.
Fight of the Night: No bonus awarded.
 Performance of the Night: Tom Aspinall, Arnold Allen, Paddy Pimblett, Molly McCann, Ilia Topuria, Makwan Amirkhani, Sergei Pavlovich, Paul Craig, and Muhammad Mokaev

Aftermath
The event was widely regarded by the MMA media as the best event of 2022.

See also 

 List of UFC events
 List of current UFC fighters
 2022 in UFC

References 

UFC Fight Night
2022 in mixed martial arts
March 2022 sports events in the United Kingdom
2022 sports events in London